Martha Susan Baker (December 25, 1871 – December 21, 1911) was an American painter, muralist and teacher born in Evansville, Indiana, United States.

Early life
Baker studied art at the School of the Art Institute of Chicago where she later taught.

Career
She wrote and illustrated numerous articles for The Sketch Book: A magazine Devoted to the Fine Arts, published in Chicago.

Baker exhibited her work at the Illinois building at the 1893 World's Columbian Exposition in Chicago, Illinois.

Baker painted one in a series of eight murals, begun in 1900, that were located on the tenth floor of the Fine Arts Building, located at 410 South Michigan Avenue, Chicago.

In 1903, she appeared on the “Jury of Selection” for the Annual exhibition of the Art Students League of Chicago.

Baker died in Chicago in 1911.

Works
referenced at unless otherwise noted.
 Carl Van Vechten, portrait, Yale University, Beinecke Rare Book and Manuscript Library, New Haven, Connecticut
 Dr. 	Martin Henry Fischer, portrait, Cincinnati Art Museum, Cincinnati, Ohio
 Mrs. Martin Henry Fischer, Cincinnati Art Museum
 Girl’s head, Cleveland Museum of Art, Cleveland, Ohio
 Miss Ethel Coe, portrait, Cleveland Museum of Art
 Twilight No. 2 1898, Smithsonian American Art Museum, Washington, D.C.
 Mrs. Otto Buehrmann, portrait, Chicago Historical Society, Chicago, Illinois
 Elizabeth Humphrey, portrait, Metropolitan Museum of Art, New York, New York
 In an Old Gown, Union League Club of Chicago, Chicago, Illinois
 Carl Van Vechten, portrait, American Academy and Institute of Arts and Letters, New York, New York

References

1871 births
1911 deaths
19th-century American painters
20th-century American painters
American women painters
19th-century American women artists
20th-century American women artists
School of the Art Institute of Chicago alumni
People from Evansville, Indiana
Painters from Indiana
School of the Art Institute of Chicago faculty